MyLoveILove (stylised as myloveilove) is a studio album by Bogdan Raczynski. It was released on Rephlex Records in 2001. All the tracks are named as "MyLoveILove".

Track listing

References

2001 albums
Bogdan Raczynski albums